According to the 2010 census, the major languages spoken in Belize include English, Spanish and Kriol, all three spoken by more than 40% of the population. Mayan languages are also spoken in certain areas, as well as German.

English is the official language and the primary language of public education, though spoken natively by a minority of people as a first language. Spanish is taught in primary and secondary schools as well. Bilingualism is very common. The percentage of literacy in Belize as of 2021 is 82.68% for those aged 15 or older.

Major languages by district

English is the major language in the primary and most populated Belize District. Spanish is the most used language in the frontier districts of Cayo, Orange Walk and Corozal. Creole is the main language in the Stann Creek district, and Mayan languages dominate in the southernmost district of Toledo.

Standard English and Belizean Creole

English is the official language of Belize, a former British colony. It is the primary language of public education, government and most media outlets. The majority of Belizeans, regardless of ethnicity, speak an English-based creole called Belizean Creole (also referred to as Kriol) during most informal, social and interethnic dialogue.  According to the 2008 Official Education policy in Belize, children are to be taught when it is appropriate to use Creole, but lessons are not to be taught in Creole language.

When a Creole language exists alongside its lexifier language, as in Belize, a creole continuum forms between the Creole and the lexifier language. This is known as code-switching. It is therefore difficult to substantiate or differentiate the number of Creole speakers compared to English speakers. Belizean Creole might best be described as the lingua franca of the nation.

In 2007 an English/Kriol dictionary was published by the Belize Kriol Project; the dictionary includes translations and grammatical descriptions.

Spanish

Approximately 50% of Belizeans self-identify as Mestizo, Latino or Hispanic.  Spanish is spoken as a native tongue by about 45% of the population, and taught in schools to children who do not have it as their first language. "Kitchen Spanish" is an intermediate form of Spanish mixed with Belizean Creole, and is spoken in northern towns such as Corozal and San Pedro.

Over half the population is bilingual, and a large segment is multilingual. Being such a small and multiethnic state surrounded by Spanish-speaking nations, multilingualism is strongly encouraged in the society.

Other languages
Belize is also home to three Mayan languages: Q’eqchi’, the endangered indigenous Belizean language of Mopan, and Yucatec Maya.

Approximately 16,100 people speak the Arawakan-based Garifuna language.

German is spoken in Mennonite colonies and villages. The vast majority of Mennonites in Belize speaks Plautdietsch in every day life while a minority of some 10 percent speaks Pennsylvania German. Both groups use the German Bible translation of Martin Luther and an old fashioned Standard German in church and in reading and writing.

See also 
 Kriol people
 Demographics of Belize
 Ethnic Chinese in Belize
 Maya peoples

References